Washington Department of Children, Youth, and Families (DYCF) is an agency of the State of Washington, United States focusing on services for children. It was created by House Bill 1661, which was signed by Governor Jay Inslee on July 6, 2017.

References

External links
 Washington Department of Children, Youth, and Families

Child abuse in the United States
Child welfare in the United States
State agencies of Washington (state)